The laced woodpecker (Picus vittatus) is a species of bird in the family Picidae.

It is found throughout Southeast Asia in the countries of Cambodia, China, Indonesia, Laos, Malaysia, Myanmar, Singapore, Thailand and Vietnam. A sole specimen recorded for Bangladesh has since been reidentified as a streak-breasted woodpecker.

Its natural habitats are subtropical or tropical dry forest, subtropical or tropical moist lowland forest, subtropical or tropical mangrove forest, and subtropical or tropical moist montane forest.

Gallery

References

laced woodpecker
Birds of Southeast Asia
laced woodpecker
Taxa named by Louis Jean Pierre Vieillot
Articles containing video clips
Taxonomy articles created by Polbot